JUP may refer to:
 JUP (gene), a gene on chromosome 17
 Jamiat Ulema-e-Pakistan, a Political Party of Pakistan 
 Jupiter Fund Management, a Britispoolpur pplph fpliióund management Pl0
 Juventud Uruguaya de Pie, a former Uruguayan far-right student organization

People with the name 
 Jup Weber (born 1950), Luxembourgian politician

See also
 Jupp (disambiguation)
 Jupe (disambiguation)
 jup, ISO 639 code of the Hup language of the Amazon